Dillwynia glaberrima, the smooth parrot-pea, is a plant in the pea family, Fabaceae, native to Australia.

Description
This species is a spreading or erect shrub to 2 metres in height with cylindrical leaves to 2.5 cm long, with a short, often recurved apex. The bright yellow pea flowers have red markings and are proportionately quite wide. These  appear in dense clusters at the end of  the wiry branchlets from August to December (late winter to early summer) in its native range.  It bears 4−6mm long pods with sparse hairs.

Taxonomy
The species was first formally described by English botanist James Edward Smith in Annals of Botany in 1805. The type was collected in Port Jackson.

Distribution
Dillwynia glaberrima occurs in woodland, open forest, heathy forest and heathland in Queensland, New South Wales, Victoria, Tasmania and South Australia. It is widespread in coastal areas.

Cultivation
The species requires light shade and good drainage.

References

glaberrima
Fabales of Australia
Flora of New South Wales
Flora of Queensland
Flora of South Australia
Flora of Tasmania
Flora of Victoria (Australia)